Nogometni klub Brežice 1919, commonly referred to as NK Brežice 1919 or simply Brežice, is a Slovenian football club from Brežice. As of the 2022–23 season, they compete in the Slovenian Third League, the third tier of Slovenian football.

The club was formerly known as Svoboda Brežice.

Honours
Slovenian Third League
 Winners: 2015–16

Slovenian Fourth Division
 Winners: 1992–93, 2001–02, 2014–15

Slovenian Fifth Division
 Winners: 2007–08, 2009–10

MNZ Celje Cup
 Winners: 2015–16, 2018–19

League history since 1991

References

External links
Official website 

Association football clubs established in 1919
Association football clubs established in 2013
Football clubs in Slovenia
1919 establishments in Slovenia
2013 establishments in Slovenia